Pravda Castle is a castle ruin on a hill in Pnětluky in the Ústí nad Labem Region of the Czech Republic.

Etymology
The name literally means "truth".

History
The first written mention of Pravda is from 1380. Today's castle was probably built during second half of 15th century on top of a prehistoric fortification. At the time of construction it was a very modern and strong fortress. During the 16th century the importance of the castle diminished, resulting in its abandonment.

In modern times it has become a target for tourists and a place of meetings and festivals, during the 20th century, the castle's structure deteriorated significantly and attempts are being made to stabilize it.

See also
 List of castles in the Ústí nad Labem Region

External links
 Details about Pravda Castle 

Louny District
Castles in the Ústí nad Labem Region
Ruined castles in the Czech Republic
Articles containing video clips